The National Information Communications Technology Development Authority (NiDA) is a government agency responsible for managing the development of the information technology industry in Cambodia.  Among the agency's projects are the computerization of government function and training of internet personnel.

Projects
 GAIS, or Government Administration Information System, an approach to the overall computerization of the government using three core applications: Vehicle registration, Real estate registration and Resident registration. 
 PAIS, or Provincial Administration Information System, involving GAIS methods to computerize the government at provincial level.
 Cisco Networking Academy Program, in association with the Royal University of Phnom Penh, awarding Cisco Career Certifications.

See also
 Communications in Cambodia
 Information and communication technologies (ICT)
 Information and communication technologies in education
 Ministry of Posts and Telecommunications, Cambodia

References

External links
 National Information Communications Technology Development Authority official page

Communications in Cambodia
Government agencies of Cambodia
Government agencies established in 2000
Organisations based in Phnom Penh